Keith Morton (11 August 1934 – 24 November 2021) was an English professional footballer who scored 52 goals from 176 appearances in the Football League for Crystal Palace and Darlington in the 1950s and early 1960s. He played for Palace as an amateur, and was on the books of Sunderland before spending the majority of his career with Darlington. He began his career as a centre forward and finished as an outside right.

Life and career
Morton was born in Consett, County Durham. He began his football career as a teenage amateur with Crystal Palace, and scored three goals from five Third Division South appearances in the 1953–54 Football League season. He returned to the north-east of England and spent a season with First Division club Sunderland, but never appeared for their first team. In May 1955, he signed for Third Division North club Darlington, where he soon established himself as a first-team regular.

In the fourth round of the 1957–58 FA Cup, Ron Harbertson, Dave Carr and Morton scored at Stamford Bridge to give Darlington a three-goal lead over Chelsea, league champions only three years earlier, but they let the lead slip. Unfit for the replay because of injury, Morton's place went to Tommy Moran, who scored twice and created two more to inflict an embarrassing defeat on the First Division side.

In a match against local rivals Hartlepools United at Christmas 1958, he was knocked unconscious and broke bones in his neck when opposing full-back Jack Cameron fell on him after a tackle. He underwent emergency surgery and was in an upper-body cast for four months. Although able to resume his career the next season, he retired in 1961 aged just 26, having made two hundred senior appearances in all competitions, of which all but five were for Darlington. In March of that year, he shared a benefit match with Darlington's appearance-record holder Ron Greener.

After retirement, Morton sold second-hand cars in his native Consett. He died on 24 November 2021, at the age of 87.

Career statistics

References

1934 births
2021 deaths
Sportspeople from Consett
Footballers from County Durham
English footballers
Association football forwards
Crystal Palace F.C. players
Sunderland A.F.C. players
Darlington F.C. players
English Football League players